The Morning Light was an American pop rock band based in Pittsburgh, Pennsylvania, United States. The group was signed to Fearless Records.

History
The Morning Light formed in 2006 after the breakup of local group Transition. Transition's bassist, Harrison Wargo, formed a band with singer Bobby Garver, soon after adding Transition's former guitarist, Matt Colussy. Nick Baxter also joined on drums and Andrew McDonald on bass. The group toured throughout most of 2007 with Wargo and Garver as dual lead vocalists. In December 2007, the band signed to Fearless Records. In February 2008, the band began recording their debut album with producer Matt Goldman. They released their debut EP, The Sounds of Love in March 2008. Following its release the group toured with All Time Low and appeared at Bamboozle Left. In June and August 2008, the band performed on the Warped Tour. Their self-titled full-length album was released September 23, 2008 and hit #27 on the Billboard Heatseekers chart. The album featured upbeat tunes with prominent piano and vocal harmonies, and garnered comparisons to Panic! at the Disco and Steel Train. In September and October 2008, the band went on a cross-country US tour with the Rocket Summer. Wargo left the group in January 2009. Harrison Wargo now is making music solo and just released his first album titled "Speckled". Even though the band promised a new release, they broke up in October 2009. Andy has returned to school at Penn State and Matt went on to work with Maryland-based pop punk band All Time Low, with everybody else possibly moving on to other projects. The band released a final song, "Colors", which would have appeared on the new release, on their Myspace.

Members 
 Bobby Garver - Vocals
 Matt Colussy - Guitar
 Nick Baxter - Drums
 Andrew McDonald - Bass
 Harrison Wargo - Keyboards, vocals, songwriter
 Jason Mitsch - Bass guitar, bass

Discography 
 The Sounds of Love EP (Fearless Records, March 2008)
 The Morning Light (Fearless Records, September 2008)

References

External links 
 The Morning Light on Myspace
 The Morning Light on Purevolume
 The Morning Light on Facebook
 The Morning Light on Buzznet
 The Morning Light on YouTube
 Harrison Wargo on Myspace

Musical groups established in 2006
Musical groups disestablished in 2009
Rock music groups from Pennsylvania
Musical groups from Pittsburgh
Fearless Records artists
American pop rock music groups